Ali Shojaei may refer to:
 Ali Shojaei (footballer, born 1953)
 Ali Shojaei (footballer, born 1997)